Eagle NYC is a gay bar in Manhattan, New York.

Description and history
New York magazine described Eagle NYC as "a palatial two-story leather bar located near the West Side Highway" and rated the bar 79 out of 100. The bar hosts an annual Mr. Eagle competition. The venue has been located at West 28th Street and 11th Avenue since 2001.

Mike Miksche at Daily Xtra said the bar is "dependable on weekends and maintains the classic leather bar vibe".

See also

 LGBT culture in New York City
 The Eagle (bar)

References

External links
 
 Eagle NYC at Lonely Planet

Chelsea, Manhattan
Leather bars and clubs
LGBT drinking establishments in New York City